Kazinka may refer to:
Kazinka, Gryazinsky District, Lipetsk Oblast, a village (selo) in Gryazinsky District of Lipetsk Oblast, Russia
Kazinka, Zadonsky District, Lipetsk Oblast, a village in Zadonsky District of Lipetsk Oblast, Russia
Kazinka, Pskov Oblast, a village in Pskov Oblast, Russia
Kazinka, name of several other rural localities in Russia